Seegeriella is a genus of flowering plants belonging to the family Orchidaceae.

It is native to Bolivia, Ecuador and Peru in western South America.

The genus name of Seegeriella is in honour of Hans Gerhard Seeger (b. 1939), German gardener at botanical gardens in Göttingen, Hanover and Heidelberg. 
It was first described and published in J. Orchideenfr. Vol.4 on page 190 in 1997.

Known species
According to Kew:
Seegeriella crothersii 
Seegeriella pinifolia 
Seegeriella senghasiana

References

Oncidiinae
Oncidiinae genera
Plants described in 1997
Flora of Bolivia
Flora of Ecuador
Flora of Peru